StoryBots is an American children's educational media franchise best known for the Netflix series Ask the StoryBots. The StoryBots library includes educational TV series, books, videos, music, games and classroom activities designed to make foundational learning fun and encourage intellectual curiosity in children ages 3-to-8. Subjects cover a wide range of themes and feature a cast of characters called the StoryBots, who are tiny, colorful robotic creatures who have eyes on top of their head, eyebrows, rectangular bodies, have expressional semi-circles for heads that move with every syllable, long lines for limbs, circles for feet and have pincer-like appendages for hands that are either depicted as magnet shaped, half a square with a hole going out to make two fingers, simple lines, crab pincers or 9 shaped that live within computers, tablets and phones and help humans answer questions. 

After launching primarily online – and amassing more than 620 million views on YouTube – StoryBots launched its first television series on the Netflix streaming service in 2016. Now in its third season, Ask the StoryBots has won multiple Daytime Emmy Awards and an Annie Award, along with recognition from the Peabody Awards and British Academy Children's Awards, while also spawning a companion show, StoryBots Super Songs, and a holiday special, A StoryBots Christmas.

Originally created by the entertainment studio JibJab, the brand later became part of StoryBots, Inc., an independent production company, which (along with the Storybots brand) got acquired by Netflix in May 2019 as part of an overall push by the streaming service into more educational and family-oriented content.

History 
StoryBots launched to the public in the fall of 2012, and has been featured on CNN, The New York Times, CNBC, and other news outlets. Gregg Spiridellis, co-founder and CEO of StoryBots, told CNBC in 2013 that he and his brother have five young children between them and noticed "a massive shift in how kids are consuming media." Spiridellis says that became the inspiration for StoryBots, with digital content designed to be akin to Sesame Street but for a device-centric, connected generation of children.

In May 2019, Netflix announced that it had acquired the StoryBots media franchise and signed co-creators Evan and Gregg Spiridellis to an exclusive producing deal. The acquisition was the first of its kind for Netflix and was part of a stated commitment to expand its educational content.

Television programming
The StoryBots franchise's inaugural original TV series, Ask the StoryBots, premiered on Netflix on August 12, 2016. The show follows the StoryBots characters of Beep, Bing, Bang, Boop and Bo (a.k.a. "Answer Team 341B") as they go on adventures into the human world to help answer kids' biggest questions, and stars Judy Greer. The first season featured guest appearances from Jay Leno, Whoopi Goldberg, "Weird Al" Yankovic, Kevin Smith, Garfunkel and Oates, Tim Meadows and Chris Parnell. Ask the StoryBots received critical acclaim for its educational quality and entertainment value for both parents and children. A second season premiered on Netflix on August 24, 2018, and featured guest appearances from Snoop Dogg, Edward Norton, Christina Applegate, Wanda Sykes, David Cross, Ali Wong, Kristen Schaal, and David Koechner. 

A third season was released worldwide on Netflix on August 2, 2019, and includes guest appearances from John Legend, Zoe Saldana, Jennifer Garner, Jason Sudeikis, Alyssa Milano, Tony Hale, Maria Bamford and Reggie Watts. A trailer for the new episodes was released on YouTube ahead of the season launch.

Both seasons spawned music soundtracks available on Spotify, Apple Music, iTunes Amazon.com, YouTube and whereas music soundtracks are available. The show has been called the "best kids' show on Netflix" by both Wired and Decider. Ask the StoryBots has received several accolades and award nominations, including recognition from the Daytime Emmy Awards, Peabody Awards, Annie Awards and British Academy Children's Awards.

A companion series, StoryBots Super Songs, premiered on October 7, 2016, also on Netflix. While each episode of Ask the StoryBots featured the lead characters answering a child's single question, StoryBots Super Songs focuses on broader topics, such as outer space, colors, shapes and dinosaurs, through music and live-action vignettes with real children. Episodes have also been released on StoryBots' YouTube channel.

Ask the StoryBots also spun-off a holiday special, A StoryBots Christmas, which premiered December 1, 2017, on Netflix. Featuring a guest appearance by Ed Asner as Santa Claus, the special received two Daytime Emmy Awards, including Outstanding Special Class Animated Program, as well as four additional nominations.

A new series called StoryBots: Answer Time premiered on Netflix on November 21, 2022 and includes guest appearances from Danny DeVito, Zooey Deschanel, Common, Sophie Turner, Kevin Smith, Anne Hathaway, Chrissy Teigen, Patton Oswalt, Gabriel Iglesias, and Craig Robinson.

Digital library 
StoryBots pairs educators and learning experts with a team of artists, storytellers and technologists to build a robust library of web-based learning content and activities available at StoryBots' official website. The StoryBots website was nominated for best youth website at the 2018 Webby Awards.

The digital library includes:

 Learning Videos, a collection of animated musical videos that explore a wide range of themes, including shapes, colors, behaviors, time, eating healthy and outer space
 Starring You Videos, animated learning music videos that allow the user to add their name and face photo
 Learning Books, educationally-focused ebooks with narration to help kids practice their reading and learn about a range of subjects
 Starring You Books, ebooks ranging from classic fairytales to modern adventures that also include face and name personalization (making the user the hero of the story)
 Activity Sheets, printable books on holidays, numbers, letters, seasons and more
 Math Games, Common Core-aligned kindergarten-level math games

StoryBots Classroom 
In 2016, StoryBots launched StoryBots Classroom, a free web-based resource for educators that includes unlimited access to the entire StoryBots library of digital books, videos and activities, as well as the newly created Common Core State Standards Initiative-aligned Math Games, and a suite of classroom management tools including the Backpack and Class Roster. The product is designed for use on laptops, tablets and interactive white boards. When it was released, StoryBots Classroom was by profiled by Education Week and was named a S'Cool Tool of the Week by EdSurge. It has since received the Teachers' Choice Award and the Tech Edvocate Award for best early childhood education app or tool. 

In an interview, CEO Gregg Spiridellis cited significant interest in StoryBots by teachers as the impetus to "invest more in building a product custom-tailored for classroom use, with an emphasis on interactive projection boards, classroom tools and more educational content."

YouTube channel
StoryBots first uploaded five videos to YouTube in June 2012. StoryBots was also nominated for a 2019 Webby Award in the Video Series & Channels – Animation category.

In 2018, StoryBots signed with the DHX Media-owned WildBrain to manage and grow its YouTube channel.

In January 2019, the channel rebranded itself as Netflix Jr. to coincide with the buyout of StoryBots by Netflix.

Print books
In addition to its ebooks available on its website, StoryBots also offers a number of print books published by Random House Children's Books featuring the StoryBots characters. Titles include:

 The Amazing Planet Earth (Step Into Reading)
 Cars Are Cool
 The Moon's Time To Shine (Step Into Reading)
 StoryBots ABC Jamboree
 Trucks Are Terrific
Tyrannosaurus Rex (Step Into Reading)

Awards 
Since its founding in 2012, StoryBots has won numerous awards for its digital content, including the Teachers' Choice Award from Learning Magazine, Parent's Choice Award, a Family Choice Award, Tech Edvocate Award, and an Editor's Choice Award from Children's Technology Review.

For its television work including Ask the StoryBots and A StoryBots Christmas, StoryBots has won five Daytime Emmy Awards (with twelve additional nominations), an Annie Award, as well as recognition from the British Academy Children's Awards and Peabody Awards.

References

External links

 Official website
 Official website

Mass media franchises
Children's literature organizations
Early childhood education
Early childhood education in the United States
Education companies established in 2012
Educational technology companies of the United States
Children's television
American educational websites
Netflix
2019 mergers and acquisitions